David John Barnes (27 April 1958 – 23 October 2020) was a New Zealand America's Cup sailor, and three-time 470 world champion.

Early years
Born in Wellington, Barnes was educated at Tawa College. He married Karen in 1986, and the couple had three children.

Sailing career
Barnes skippered the KZ1 yacht which lost to the United States in the 1988 America's Cup race.

Later years
Barnes was diagnosed with multiple sclerosis. In 2013 he became involved with Kiwi Gold Sailing, a group of paralympians attempting to qualify a Sonar for the 2016 Paralympics. The team included fellow America's Cup veteran Rick Dodson. However, Barnes' condition worsened and he withdrew from the team in 2014.

Barnes died on 23 October 2020, aged 62.

Career achievements
 1973 Won the Tanner Cup and Tauranga Cup PClass
 1974 Won the National Championship Starling Class
 1975 Third in World Youth Championship 420 Class
 1976 Third in World Youth Championship Fireball Class
 1976 Reserve for the Olympics 470 Class
 1981 Won the World Championship 470 Class
 1983 Won the World Championship 470 Class
 1984 Won the World Championship 470 Class
 1985 NZ America's Cup Challenge in Perth/Skipper KZ5/Alternate Helmsman KZ7
 1987 Skipper for KZ7/won the 12 metre Worlds in Sardinia
 1988 NZ America's Cup Challenge in San Diego/Skipper of KZ-1 New Zealand vs Dennis Conner's catamaran Stars & Stripes US-1.
 1992 NZ America's Cup Challenge in San Diego/Tactician to Rod Davis/One of four directors for the campaign
 1995 America's Cup Challenge with One Australia/Testing Helmsman/Part of "Fluid Thinking" design team
 1996 Employed by James Farmer QC/Organised and supervised construction of his Mumm 36 Keelboat/Skipper for the campaign
 2000 America's Cup Challenge with America True/Skippered one of the boats through the testing program/Conceptual Director
 2003 America's Cup Challenge with GBR/General Manager

References

1958 births
2020 deaths
Sportspeople from Wellington City
New Zealand male sailors (sport)
OK class sailors
World champions in sailing for New Zealand
470 class world champions
People with multiple sclerosis
People educated at Tawa College
2003 America's Cup sailors
2000 America's Cup sailors
1995 America's Cup sailors
1992 America's Cup sailors
1988 America's Cup sailors
1987 America's Cup sailors